NEWS (acronym for "North East West South") is a Japanese boy band consisting of Keiichiro Koyama, Takahisa Masuda and Shigeaki Kato. Formed in 2003 by Johnny Kitagawa as a nine-member group under the label Johnny's Entertainment, NEWS released a promotional single , which was used for the World Cup of Volleyball Championships. In 2004, Takahiro Moriuchi (present-day Taka of One Ok Rock) left the group and the remaining eight members released their debut single, which debuted atop the Oricon charts.

In 2006, the group released their fifth consecutive number-one single, as a six-member group due to the controversy surrounding then-members Hiroki Uchi and Hironori Kusano. After a brief hiatus, they released their seventh number-one single, . In 2008, they performed at the Tokyo Dome for the first time, and released their tenth single, "Happy Birthday", which made NEWS the second Japanese group after label-mates KinKi Kids to have ten consecutive number-one singles since their debut. NEWS became a quartet following the departures of Ryo Nishikido and Tomohisa Yamashita from the group in 2011. NEWS became a trio following the departure of Yuya Tegoshi in 2020.

History

2003–2006: Debut and departure of members
Formed in September 2003, NEWS released a promotional single, which was used as the theme song for the World Cup of Volleyball Championships. Before holding their first concert, Takahiro Moriuchi left the group. NEWS later released their debut single, "Kibō: Yell", which topped the Oricon chart.

In July 2005, Uchi Hiroki was caught for underage drinking and suspended indefinitely from both NEWS and Kanjani8, another group he was a part of. Despite having lost a member, NEWS released their fourth single, which like its predecessors debuted at number one. In January 2006, NEWS was reduced to six members when Hironori Kusano was suspended indefinitely for the same charge as Uchi. NEWS released their fifth single,  (March 2006), which was their fifth consecutive number-one single. On May 1, 2006, after NEWS finished their "NEWS Spring Tour", the group went on hiatus.

2007–2010: NEWS' six-member years
On December 30, 2006, it was announced that NEWS would make their return at Johnny's Concert Countdown 2006-2007 as a six-member group, since Hiroki Uchi and Hironori Kusano had been demoted to trainees. To mark their return, NEWS embarked on a tour and released their sixth single . "Hoshi wo Mezashite" became their sixth number-one single, which went on to be used as the theme song for the Japanese version of Happy Feet.

On November 7, NEWS simultaneously released their seventh single, "Weeeek" and their second album, Pacific. Both releases debut topped their respective charts with "Weeeek" selling 263,000 copies in its first week and Pacific selling 196,000 copies in their first week. This marked the tenth in Oricon history that an artist had both their single and album debut top the charts simultaneously. To further support their album, NEWS went on a nationwide tour, NEWS Concert Tour Pacific 2007-2008, from December 15, 2007 to January 27, 2008. Because tickets were in such high demand, two more dates were added to the concert, which resulted in NEWS performing at the Tokyo Dome for the first time.

In February 2008 NEWS released their eighth number-one single, which was used as the theme song for the movie Kurosagi, starring Tomohisa Yamashita. NEWS released two more number-one singles, "Summer Time" (May 2008) and "Happy Birthday" (October 2008), before releasing their third studio album Color (November 2008). The release of "Happy Birthday" made NEWS the second group, after the KinKi Kids, to have ten consecutive number-one singles since their debut. Color debuted at the number one position on the charts, giving NEWS their third consecutive album. NEWS released their new single,  on April 29, 2009. It became their 11th number-one single. Their 12th number-one single titled "Sakura Girl" was released on March 31, 2010. At the "Live! Live! Live! NEWS Dome Party 2010" concert at Tokyo Dome, it was announced that NEWS would be releasing their 13th single, "Fighting Man", on November 3.

2011: Becoming a quartet
On October 7, 2011, it was announced that both Ryo Nishikido and Tomohisa Yamashita left the group. The official press release from Johnny & Associates explained that Nishikido was leaving because scheduling conflicts made it difficult for him to be active in both NEWS and Kanjani8, while Yamashita was leaving to concentrate on solo projects. Nishikido continued his activities with Kanjani8 but not NEWS. NEWS continued as a four-member group with Keiichiro Koyama, Takahisa Masuda, Shigeaki Kato and Yuya Tegoshi.

2012–2013: NEWS' four-member comeback
On April 15, 2012, a countdown appeared on the Johnny's Entertainment website, revealing the four current member's outlines, suggesting a comeback. On April 16, Johnny's special site for NEWS restarted its countdown, which hit "0:00:00" on April 18 (12 midnight, JST). The time coincided with NEWS' member Keiichiro Koyama's radio program "K-chan NEWS" to start its broadcast. Koyama's special guests were co-members Tegoshi Yuya, Takahisa Masuda, and Kato Shigeaki. Earlier, Keiichiro Koyama had mentioned something about a new single and best-of album.

Fans could participate in their Best of Album. Fans voted for their "Top Four Favorite NEWS songs" on Johnny's Entertainment site starting April 18 at 12 noon, JST.

On May 7, JE side announced the new album titled NEWS Best. It was released on June 13. The album came in a regular edition and a limited edition version.

Both versions included a CD containing all 15 of the group's A-side singles. The regular edition included an extra CD with the group's top 15 non-single songs as voted by fans. The limited edition included an extra CD with previously unreleased solo songs.

On July 18, NEWS released "Chankapana", their first single as a quartet. The single is available in 5 different version and a limited box set collection of all versions. The music video  premiered on TV on July 9, 2012. The single sold 121,097 on its first day and went on to become number one on Oricon Weekly Singles Chart.

On July 17, 2013, NEWS released their fifth studio album of the same name. The album contains seventeen tracks, four of them being solo songs. The new tracks were used in the group's tenth anniversary tour. The group's logo, a purple square, a pink heart, a yellow triangle, and a green circle, was commonly used in this time period. Each shape and/or represents one member, along with one letter (N, E, W, or S).

2014–2020: NEWS changes
On February 25, 2015, NEWS' released another album, White. Five more albums and 11 singles since then, including a single, "Top Gun/Love Story", which was released on June 6, 2019, and an album, Story, which was released on March 3, 2020.

Yuya Tegoshi left the group on June 19, 2020.

2020–present: Releases as a trio
On December 23, 2020, NEWS released "Beautiful / Chinchaumakka / Kanariya" their first single as a trio.

Members

Current members
 Keiichiro Koyama – vocals (2003–present) ,group leader (2012–present)
 Shigeaki Kato – vocals (2003–present)
 Takahisa Masuda – vocals (2003–present)

Former members
 Takahiro Moriuchi – vocals (2003)
 Hiroki Uchi – vocals (2003–2005)
 Hironori Kusano – vocals (2003–2006)
 Ryo Nishikido – vocals (2003–2011)
 Tomohisa Yamashita – vocals (2003–2011)
 Yuya Tegoshi – vocals (2003–2020)

Timeline

Discography

Studio albums
 Touch (2005)
 Pacific (2007)
 Color (2008)
 Live (2010)
 NEWS (2013)
 White (2015)
 Quartetto (2016)
 Neverland (2017)
 Epcotia (2018)
 Worldista (2019)
 Story (2020)
 Ongaku (2022)

Compilation albums
 NEWS Best (2012)

Concerts 
 Aishin Taiwan (October 10, 2003, special appearance in Taipei)
 A Happy “NEWS” Year 2004 (January 1–4, 2004 Hotel Grand Pacific Meridien, 13 performances)
 SUMMARY of Johnny's World (August 8–29, 2004, Harajuku New Big Top, 35 performances)
 NEWSnowCONCERT ~NEWS no Konsatou~ December 28, 2004 - January 7, 2005, 13 performances in 2 cities)
 NIPPON EAST TO WEST SPRING CONCERT ~Nihon Oudan Taisetsu na Hito e~ (March 31 - May 5, 2005, 14 performances in 5 cities)
 Johnny's Theater “SUMMARY 2005” (July 26–28, August 30 - September 4, 2005, Shinagawa Prince Hotel Stellar Ball, 27 performances)
 A HAPPY “NEWS” YEAR 2006 (January 3–9, 2006, 12 performances in 2 cities)
 NEWS SPRING TOUR 2006 (March 25 - April 30, 2006, 14 performances in 5 cities)
 NEWS Concert Tour 2007 (February 17 - April 15, 2007, 21 performances in 8 cities)
 NEWS FIRST CONCERT 2007 in Taipei (7 October 2007, Taipei Arena, 2 performances)
 NEWS CONCERT TOUR “pacific” 2007-2008 (December 15, 2007 - January 27, 2008, 28 performances in 10 cities)
 NEWS WINTER PARTY DIAMOND (October 25, 2008 - January 12, 2009, 39 performances in 10 cities)
 LIVE! LIVE! LIVE! NEWS DOME PARTY 2010 (September 18–28, 2010, 7 performances in 2 cities)
 NEWS LIVE TOUR ~Utsukushii Koi ni Suru yo~ (August 14, 2012 - September 30, 2012, 10 performances in 7 cities)
 NEWS LIVE TOUR 2013 NEWS MAKES YOU HAPPY! MAKES THE WORLD HAPPIER! (July 26, 2013 - August 27, 2013, 14 performances in 7 cities)
 NEWS 10th Anniversary in Tokyo Dome (September 7, 2013, 1 performance in 1 city)
 NEWS LIVE TOUR 2015 WHITE (March 20 - June 14, 2015, 13 performances in 7 cities)
 NEWS LIVE TOUR 2016 QUARTETTO (March 26 - June 12, 2016, 17 performances in 8 cities)
 NEWS LIVE TOUR 2017 NEVERLAND (April 1–11 June 2017, 23 performances in 9 cities)
 NEWS ARENA TOUR 2018 EPCOTIA (March 31 - May 20, 2018, 24 performances in 8 cities)
 NEWS 15th Anniversary LIVE 2018 "Strawberry" (August 11–12, 2018, Ajinomoto Stadium, 2 performances)
 NEWS DOME TOUR 2018-2019 EPCOTIA -ENCORE- (December 31, 2018 - January 7, 2019, 4 performances in 2 cities)
 NEWS LIVE TOUR 2019 WORLDISTA (March 9, 2019 - May 26, 2019, 27 performances in 9 cities)
 NEWS LIVE TOUR 2020 STORY 
 NEWS LIVE TOUR 2022 ONGAKU ( August 26, 2022 - November 26, 2022 , 25 performances in 8 cities)

Events 
 Johnny's Physical Health Day Fans Thanksgiving (October 12, 2003)
 NEWS Daishukai (November 9 - December 14, 2003)
 NEWS Private Party (September 19 and September 23, 2004)
 Atsumare!!!! Chankapaana (August 20–27, 2012)

Phone application 
 NEWS ni Koishite (2018)
 Strawberry Goods (2018)

References

External links

 Official website
(English) Official website



Japanese boy bands
Japanese pop music groups
Japanese idol groups
Johnny & Associates
Musical groups from Tokyo